"Empini" is a song by South African singer  Kelly Khumalo from her studio album, The Voice of Africa. It was released on June 19, 2020, as the lead single from the album.

The song was certified 4× platinum by the Recording Industry of South Africa  (RiSA).

Commercial performance 
The song peaked number one on South Africa Afro Pop Music charts.

At 27th South African Music Awards, "Empini" was nominated for Record of the Year  (fan-voted).

! 
|-
|2020
|"Empini"
|Record Of The Year 
| 
|

Track listing
Digital download and streaming
 "Empini"  – 4:49

Personnel 
"Empini" credits are adapted from AllMusic.
 Kelly Khumalo - Vocals, Primary Artist, Composer  
 Mondli Ngcobo - Composer, Producer

Certifications and sales

Release history

References 

2020 songs
2020 singles
Universal Records singles
Zulu-language songs